Nížkov is a municipality and village in Žďár nad Sázavou District in the Vysočina Region of the Czech Republic. It has about 1,000 inhabitants.

Administrative parts
Villages of Buková and Špinov are administrative parts of Nížkov.

References

Villages in Žďár nad Sázavou District